John Blow (baptised 23 February 1649 – 1 October 1708) was an English composer and organist of the Baroque period. Appointed organist of Westminster Abbey in late 1668, his pupils included William Croft, Jeremiah Clarke and Henry Purcell. In 1685 he was named a private musician to James II. His only stage composition, Venus and Adonis (ca. 1680–1687), is thought to have influenced Henry Purcell's later opera Dido and Aeneas. In 1687, he became choirmaster at St Paul's Cathedral, where many of his pieces were performed. In 1699 he was appointed to the newly created post of Composer to the Chapel Royal.

Early life and education
Blow was probably born in the village of Collingham in Nottinghamshire. The parish registers at Newark record the baptisms of Blow and of his brother and sister, the marriage of his parents, and the burial of his father. The register of Lambeth degrees notes that in 1677, on taking his doctorate, Blow said that his birthplace was 'the faithful borough of Newark'. As he was baptised on 23 February 1649, he was likely born only a short while before. As a boy, he was selected as a chorister of the Chapel Royal, and distinguished himself by his proficiency in music.

Blow composed several anthems at an unusually early age, including Lord, Thou hast been our refuge, Lord, rebuke me not and the so-called "club anthem", I will always give thanks, the last in collaboration with Pelham Humfrey and William Turner, either in honour of a victory over the Dutch in 1665, or more probably simply to commemorate the friendly intercourse of the three choristers.

Early career
In 1668, he was an organist at Westminster Abbey. He composed a two-part setting of Robert Herrick's "Goe, perjur'd man", written at the request of Charles II to imitate Giacomo Carissimi's "Dite, o cieli". In 1674, he was made a gentleman of the Chapel Royal and Master of the Children of the Chapel Royal.

Marriage and family
In September 1673, Blow married Elizabeth Braddock. She died in childbirth ten years later. Two of his sons died, but there were also three daughters, who survived him.

Advance to court
Blow, who by 1678 was a doctor of music, was named in 1685 one of the private musicians of James II. Between 1680 and 1687, he wrote his only stage composition of which any record survives, the Masque for the entertainment of the King, Venus and Adonis. In this, Mary Davis played the part of Venus. Lady Mary Tudor, her daughter by Charles II, appeared as Cupid.

In 1687, Blow became choirmaster (or Master of the Choristers) at St Paul's Cathedral.  In 1690 he built a house for himself in Hampton. (Blow also owned eight other houses in the vicinity of Westminster Abbey). The Hampton house was demolished in 1799. It was on the site of the present-day house known as Beveree in the High Street.

In 1695 he was elected organist of St Margaret's, Westminster, and is said to have resumed his post as organist of Westminster Abbey, from which in 1679 he had retired or been dismissed to make way for Purcell. In 1700, he was appointed to the newly created post of Composer to the Chapel Royal.

Blow died on 1 October 1708 aged 59 at his house in Broad Sanctuary. He is buried in Westminster Abbey.

Music

Blow wrote fourteen services and 30 odes for royal celebrations, 50 secular song-like pieces and more than a hundred anthems.

In addition to purely ecclesiastical music and his relatively well-known masque Venus and Adonis, Blow's works include Great sir, the joy of all our hearts, an ode for New Year's Day 1682, similar compositions for 1683, 1686, 1687, 1688, 1689, 1693 (?), 1694 and 1700; odes, and the like, for the celebration of St Cecilia's Day for 1684, 1691, 1695 and 1700; for the coronation of James II, two anthems, Behold, O God, our Defender and God spake sometime in visions; some harpsichord pieces for the second part of Henry Playford's Musick's handmaid (1689); Epicedium for Queen Mary (1695) and Ode on the Death of Purcell (1696).

In 1700 he published his Amphion Anglicus, a collection of pieces of music for one, two, three and four voices, with a figured bass accompaniment. This includes a setting for voice and continuo of the poem The Self Banished by Edmund Waller.

Legacy and honours
Commissioned by the City of Birmingham Symphony Orchestra, Arthur Bliss composed Meditations on a Theme by John Blow in 1955 based on Blow's verse anthem "The Lord is my Shepherd". 
The tercentenary of his death was marked by BBC Radio 3 and Westminster Abbey: the weekly broadcast of choral evensong was made by the choir of Westminster Abbey, live from the Abbey, and consisted of music mostly by him, and by his near contemporaries.

References

External links

John Blow MIDI file "Fair Celia" Tony Catalano's Classical Guitar MIDI Page

1649 births
1708 deaths
17th-century English composers
18th-century keyboardists
18th-century English people
English classical composers
English male classical composers
English Baroque composers
English classical organists
British male organists
Cathedral organists
Gentlemen of the Chapel Royal
Masters of the Children of the Chapel Royal
Children of the Chapel Royal
People from Newark-on-Trent
Burials at Westminster Abbey
17th-century male musicians
Male classical organists